Moses McClean (June 17, 1804 – September 30, 1870) was a Democratic member of the U.S. House of Representatives from Pennsylvania.

Moses McClean was born on his father William McLean's farm in Carroll's Tract ( near Gettysburg, Pennsylvania). He studied law, was admitted to the bar in 1825, and commenced practice in Gettysburg.

McClean was elected as a Democrat to the Twenty-ninth Congress and supported the declaration of war against Mexico during the Mexican–American War. After his term expired, he resumed the practice of law in Gettysburg.  He returned to politics briefly as a conservative member of the Pennsylvania House of Representatives in 1855, representing the Know Nothing political movement. He continued the practice of law until his death in Gettysburg in 1870. During the Battle of Gettysburg in July 1863, his brick home on Baltimore Street was struck by an errant Union artillery shell, but McClean and his family were unharmed.

References

 The Political Graveyard
 History of Cumberland and Adams Counties, Pennsylvania. Chicago:  Warner, Beers & Co., 1886.

1804 births
1870 deaths
Democratic Party members of the Pennsylvania House of Representatives
People from Gettysburg, Pennsylvania
Pennsylvania Know Nothings
Burials at Evergreen Cemetery (Adams County, Pennsylvania)
Democratic Party members of the United States House of Representatives from Pennsylvania
19th-century American politicians